The Florida Second District Court of Appeal is headquartered in Lakeland, Florida and has a branch on the campus of Stetson University College of Law in Tampa. There are fourteen counties in the Second District, which includes a population of over 5.5 million people.  The Second District covers Pasco and Pinellas (6th judicial circuit); Hardee, Highlands, and Polk (10th judicial circuit); DeSoto, Manatee, and Sarasota (12th judicial circuit); Hillsborough (13th judicial circuit); and Charlotte, Glades, Collier, Hendry, and Lee (20th judicial circuit).

History
The initial territorial jurisdiction of the Second District, with its headquarters in Lakeland, encompassed twenty-eight counties, ranging from Lake County in the north, to Collier County and Broward County in the south.

In 1965, the Fourth District was established, reducing the Second District's territory, which was further reduced by the establishment of the Fifth District in 1979. There are now fourteen counties in the Second District.

When the District Court of an Appeal for the Second District first convened, its headquarters were in the old Florida Citrus Commission building in Lakeland. In 1980 a branch headquarters for the Second District was authorized and in that same year was established in Tampa where the court maintains an additional courtroom and where eight of the court's judges now have their chambers. The chambers of six judges, the clerk's office, the marshal's office, and the court records are located in the court's Lakeland headquarters. The court hears oral arguments in both its Lakeland and Tampa courtrooms. Periodically, the court also hears oral arguments in county courthouses in various counties within the district.

Originally there were three judges in the Second District. There are now 14 judges on the court.

Active Judges

Chief Judges
Judges who have served as Chief Judge of the Second DCA include but are not limited to:

Abram Otto Kanner (1957–?)
George T. Shannon 
William P. Allen 
David F. Patterson (2000–2001)
Morris Silberman
Nelly Khouzam (July 1)

Past Judges
Judges who have served on the Second DCA include:
Charles T. Canady
David F. Patterson
John Scheb
John Badalamenti

See also
 Florida District Courts of Appeal (for history and general overview)
 Florida First District Court of Appeal
 Florida Third District Court of Appeal 
 Florida Fourth District Court of Appeal
 Florida Fifth District Court of Appeal

References

External links
Website of the Florida District Courts of Appeal
Florida Second District Court of Appeal Website

Florida appellate courts
Courts and tribunals with year of establishment missing